Twin Lakes State Beach is a beach located on Monterey Bay directly south of the Santa Cruz Yacht Harbor Santa Cruz, in coastal Santa Cruz County, northern California.

This mile-long shoreline is a popular place for swimming and picnicking, along with birdwatching in the adjacent Schwan's Lake.

It has a small craft harbor parallel to East Cliff and Portola Drives.

See also
 List of beaches in California

 List of California state parks

References

External links
  California State Parks: Twin Lakes State Beach website

California State Beaches
Santa Cruz, California
Beaches of Santa Cruz County, California
Parks in Santa Cruz County, California
Monterey Bay